Rossetti may refer to:

 House of Rossetti, an Italian noble family
 Biagio Rossetti (c. 1447–1516), architect and urbanist from Ferrara, the first to use modern methods
 Carlo Rossetti (1614–1681), Italian cardinal, nobleman
 Cezaro Rossetti (1901–1950), Scottish Esperanto writer
 Francesco Rossetti (1833–1885), Italian physicist
 Gabriele Rossetti (1783–1854), poet, scholar and Italian émigré to England, father of Dante Gabriel, Christina Georgina, William Michael, and Maria Francesca
 Dante Gabriel Rossetti (1828–1882), English poet, illustrator, painter and translator, founder member of the Pre-Raphaelite Brotherhood
 Christina Georgina Rossetti (1830–1894), English poet
 Maria Francesca Rossetti (1827–1876), English author
 William Michael Rossetti (1829–1919), English writer and critic, founder member of the Pre-Raphaelite Brotherhood
 Gino Rossetti (former name Rosetti, 1904–1992), Italian football player
 Giuseppina Rossetti, mother of Lorenzo Respighi (1824–1889), Italian mathematician and natural philosopher
 Mario J. Rossetti (1935–2014), American jurist
 Raffaele Rossetti (1881–1951), Italian engineer and military naval officer who sank the main battleship of the Austro-Hungarian Empire at the end of World War I. Politician of the Italian Republican Party.
 Reto Rossetti (1909–1994), British-based, officially Italian-Swiss poet and Esperantist professor, brother of Cezaro
 Sergio Rossetti Morosini (born 1953), New York author, painter, sculptor and independent filmmaker
 Stefano Rossetti or Rossetto (fl. 1560–1580), Italian composer to the Medici
 Stephen Joseph Rossetti (born 1951), American Roman Catholic priest, author, lecturer and psychologist
 Rossetti Architects, a Detroit architectural design firm

See also
 Rosseti, a Russian power company
 Rosetti (disambiguation)
 Rosette (disambiguation)
 Rosetti family, a Moldavian princely family